Acer Extensa series is an affordable line of Acer laptops designed for office and business users. Its competitors include the Dell Vostro, and HP ProBook lines and low-end Lenovo ThinkPad laptops. The Extensa series includes several notebooks with different design, performance and functionality. The Extensa name had been used by Texas Instruments, which sold its mobile computing division to Acer in 1997.

History

Models
Acer Extensa 15 — 15" model line with plastic case; 2020 model - Intel Core i3/i5 U series, 1920x1080 TN screen, buttonless touchpad.

Current models 
Extensa 15 (EX215-55)

Extensa 15 (EX215-54)

Extensa 15 (EX215-53)

Extensa 15 (EX215-52)

Extensa 15 (EX215-32)

Extensa 15 (EX215-22)

Extensa 14 (EX214-53)

Extensa 14 (EX214-52)

Early models

Discontinued Acer models

TI models 

 Extensa 450 (1995)
 57x series (1996)

See also
Acer Aspire and TravelMate
Dell Vostro and Latitude
Fujitsu LIFEBOOK
HP ProBook and EliteBook
Lenovo ThinkPad

External links

Acer - Products
Acer Extensa | Business Laptops | Acer United States

References

Acer Inc. laptops
Business laptops